Lanao del Norte (Cebuano: Amihanang Lanao; ; Maranao: Pangotaraan Ranao), officially the Province of Lanao del Norte, is a province in the Philippines located in the Northern Mindanao region. Its capital is Tubod.

The province borders Lanao del Sur to the southeast, Zamboanga del Sur to the west, Illana Bay to the southwest, Iligan Bay to the north, Misamis Oriental to the northeast, and is separated from Misamis Occidental by Panguil Bay to the northwest. According to the 2020 census, the province has a total population of 722,902 people.

Situated within Lanao del Norte is the highly urbanized city of Iligan, which is governed independently from the province.

History

The province of Lanao existed from 1914 until 1959. In 1959, Republic Act No. 222 was passed by the Philippine Congress, partitioning Lanao into two provinces: Lanao del Norte and Lanao del Sur. The new province was inaugurated on July 4, with Iligan City as its capital.

The province then consisted of the municipalities of Baloi, Kauswagan, Bacolod, Maigo, Kolambugan, Tubod, Baroy, Lala, Kapatagan, Karomatan and the following municipal districts that got converted into regular municipalities of Matungao, Pantao Ragat, Munai, Tangcal, and Nunungan.

In 1977, President Ferdinand E. Marcos signed Resolution No. 805, s. 1977 of the Sangguniang Panlalawigan (Parliamentary Bill No. 586) sponsored by Assemblyman Abdullah D. Dimaporo, into Presidential Decree 181 transferring the province's capital from Iligan City to the municipality of Tubod.

In October 1984, inaugural ceremonies were held to celebrate the occasion of the transfer of the Provincial Capitol from Poblacion, Tubod to the Don Mariano Marcos Government Center (now Governor Arsenio A. Quibranza Provincial Government Center) at Pigcarangan, in Tubod.

Despite the outbreak of the conflict of the MILF led by Abdullah Commander Bravo Goldiano Macapaar bin Sabbar and the Philippine Army in Kauswagan in March 2000, through the provincial government's effort, peace and order was restored in the province.

In 2018, the Bangsamoro Organic Law was passed into law; this law provided for the establishment of a new Bangsamoro autonomous region to replace the Autonomous Region in Muslim Mindanao. According to this law, the six municipalities of Munai, Tagoloan, Pantar, Baloi, Tangcal, and Nunungan would be incorporated into this new region should a majority of voters in both the affected municipality and the parent province vote in favor of inclusion of the aforementioned municipalities in the proposed autonomous region in a plebiscite. The plebiscite was held the following year. A majority of voters in the affected municipalities voted in favor of inclusion in the Bangsamoro Autonomous Region; however, the rest of Lanao del Norte voted strongly against, and as a result, none of the six municipalities are included in the new autonomous region. The provincial government of Lanao del Norte had campaigned against the inclusion of the six municipalities into the region.

Geography
Lanao del Norte is a rugged province that ranges from the coastal shorelines in the north to the high plateaus and mountains in the south. It has also diverse flora and fauna.

Lanao del Norte covers a total area of  occupying the southwestern section of the Northern Mindanao region in Mindanao. The province is bordered by Lanao del Sur to the southeast, Zamboanga del Sur to the west, Illana Bay to the southwest, Iligan Bay to the north, and Misamis Oriental to the northeast, and Panguil Bay to the northwest.

Administrative divisions
Lanao del Norte comprises 22 municipalities. The city of Iligan administers itself independently as a highly urbanized city.

Demographics

The people in Lanao del Norte are a mixture of Maranaos and Cebuanos, with some Zamboangueños, Tausugs, Yakan, and Sama-Bajau. Historically, immigrants who came from the Christian provinces of Mindanao, Visayas and Luzon tended to settle in the northern part of Lanao while the Maranaos inhabited the south. There are also a minority of Higaonons settling in the hinterlands of Iligan.

The Maranao had settled in the area long before the arrival of the Spaniards in the Philippines. Like other groups, they possess their own culture which makes them quite unique. Their language, customs, traditions, religion, social system, costumes, music, and other features are factors that make Lanao peculiar and distinct from other Philippine provinces.

The main languages are Maranao and Cebuano, with the latter being the native language of majority of the citizens of the province. Aside from this, Filipino (Tagalog) and English are understood and spoken.

Religion
According to the Philippine Statistics Authority (PSA) report in 2015, 44.19% of the population of Lanao del Norte are adherents of Islam. Other religions include Christianity, Buddhism and other beliefs.

Economy

The economy in Lanao del Norte is predominantly based on agriculture and fishing. Factories are mostly based in Iligan City. Lanao del Norte is the home of Agus Power plants 4-7 that stretch from Balo-i to Iligan City. It serves major parts of power supply in Mindanao. Tourism is also a growing economy in the province.

Politics and government
Salvador T. Lluch was the first Governor of Lanao del Norte. Second was Mohammad Ali Dimaporo, from January 1960 to September 1965 when Governor Dimaporo ran and won the congressional seat of the province. By operation of the law of succession, Vice Governor Arsenio A. Quibranza became the third Provincial Chief Executive of the province. By the mandate of the inhabitants, Governor Quibranza was elected governor in 1967 and almost unanimously re-elected in 1971 and again in 1980. When Martial Law was declared, Governor Quibranza was arrested as ordered by President Marcos. While in prison, Vice Governor “Toto” Felix Z. Actub would succeed him as Governor

By virtue of the power and impact of the People Power Revolution on EDSA on February 25, 1986, local government all over the Philippines changed the political atmosphere overnight. Lanao del Norte became one among the many provinces affected by the sudden changes brought by the "Snap Election" in February 1986. Local heads of offices and employees particularly those holding political positions were destabilized but with the installation of President Corazon Aquino as president, OIC Atty. Francisco L. Abalos became the appointed governor of the province on March 3, 1986. On February 2, 1988, Atty. Abalos was elected as governor of the province.

In the Synchronized National Election of May 11, 1992, Congressman Abdullah D. Dimaporo, a legislator and economist, was elected Provincial Governor. The Provincial government embarked on a comprehensive planning and set the groundwork for the development of the province.

In the 1998 national and local elections, Imelda Quibranza-Dimaporo, wife of Governor Abdullah D. Dimaporo was elected as Provincial Governor until 2007, and from 2016 up to present.

The eldest son of former governor and now 2nd district representative Abdullah D. Dimaporo and incumbent Gov. Imelda Q. Dimaporo,  Mohammad Khalid Q. Dimaporo enter the politics in the province from 2007 until 2016.

See also
 Lanao
 Lanao del Sur

References

External links

 
 
 Philippine Standard Geographic Code

 
Provinces of the Philippines
Provinces of Northern Mindanao
States and territories established in 1959
1959 establishments in the Philippines